Honnay is a village in Wallonia and a district of the municipality of Beauraing, located in the province of Namur, Belgium.

The village has been settled at least since Roman times. From 1115, it belonged to the Prince-Bishopric of Liège. The Neo-Romanesque village church dates from 1868. The village school was built in 1875. West of the village lies a château from the 19th century.

References

External links

Populated places in Namur (province)